Xu Jinglei (born 16 April 1974 in Chaoyang District, Beijing) is a Chinese actress and film director. She was hailed as one of the Four Dan Actresses in China. In 2002, Xu won the Huabiao Award for Outstanding New Actress for her performance in I Love You and the Hundred Flowers Award for Best Actress for Spring Subway. The same year, she won the Golden Rooster Award for Best Supporting Actress for her performance in Far From Home. In 2003, she won the directing debut award of the 23rd Golden Rooster Award for the first film she directed, My Father and I. In 2004, she won the Best Director Award at the 52nd San Sebastián International Film Festival for her film Letter from an Unknown Woman , which she composed, directed and starred in. 

On Mar 13 2006, Xu invested and founded the entertainment company Beijing Flower Blooming Network Technology Co., LTD independently.

Early life and education 
On April 16, 1974, Xu was born in Beijing, China. 
Xu graduated from Beijing Film Academy in 1997. She later returned as a teacher at the Performing Department.

Xu grew up with her parents and her younger brother. Xu Jinglei's father Xu Zijian and his mother Yu Shurong are both middle-class workers. Her Father, Xu Zijian is the director of the Great Wall Neon Factory in Beijing.

Xu was recommended to a middle school in Beijing's Chaoyang District because of her extraordinary calligraphy skills. However, she didn't like calligraphy, but was forced by her father to study in the calligraphy class in Beijing Children's Palace to practice calligraphy every day and recite poems of Tang poetry under the strict education of her father. As a child, Xu was not confident at all, and she never thought of being an actress or director.

Later, Xu Jinglei fell in love with painting. When she was 17, she spent a long time commuting to learn painting and determined to study make-up as a major in the Stage Art department of The Central Academy of Drama. However, she was not admitted by The Central Academy of Drama, but was instead admitted to the acting department of Beijing Film Academy, starting her career of acting and directing later.

Career

Acting career
In 1994, she first entered the film industry by starring in the TV series "My Deskmate". Xu Jinglei rose to fame in China with the television series A Sentimental Story (1997), where she played a policewoman who falls for a gangster. Thereafter, she starred in romance film Spicy Love Soup (1997), where she won the Society Award at the Golden Phoenix Awards for her performance. In 1998, she was elected the third most popular contemporary actress among college students and the top 10 stunners of the New Weekly. In the same year, she took part in the TV drama "Love to the End". Xu solidified her success in 2002 with the films Spring Subway and I Love You, both popular hits in China and particularly with younger audiences.

In 1998, Xu and actor Li Yapeng paired up in Cherish Our Love Forever, a story based on the life and love between a group of young college students. The television series struck a chord with young audiences and became a massive hit in China, where Xu and Li were hailed as the "Nation's Couple". The two would later pair up again for the film sequel Eternal Moment (2011), set ten years after the drama.

Xu solidified her success in 2002 with the films Spring Subway and I Love You, both popular hits in China and particularly with younger audiences. Along with Zhang Ziyi, Zhou Xun and Zhao Wei, Xu was hailed as one of the Four Dan Actresses in China. Xu won the Huabiao Award for Outstanding New Actress for her performance in I Love You and the Hundred Flowers Award for Best Actress for Spring Subway. The same year, she won the Golden Rooster Award for Best Supporting Actress for her performance in Far from Home.

In June 2005, Time named Xu Jinglei as the only Chinese director and actor in an article entitled "China's New Revolution", and called her "a representative revolutionary figure in the Chinese film industry".

In 2006, Xu starred alongside Takeshi Kaneshiro, Tony Leung and Shu Qi in the crime drama Confession of Pain. She received her first acting award in Hong Kong; the year's Most Attractive Actress at the Hong Kong Society of Cinematographers (HKSC) Awards. Xu was then cast as the female lead in the war epic, The Warlords (2007) by Peter Chan.

After an extended hiatus from acting, Xu made a comeback in the science fiction thriller Battle of Memories (2017).

Directing career
Xu made her directorial debut with the film My Father and I (2003), where she also starred as the lead actress. The film, which tackled the delicate relationship between a Chinese father and his daughter, received widespread critical acclaim and won her a Golden Rooster for Best Directing Debut. Her second directorial work, Letter from an Unknown Woman (2004) was a romantic story based on the classic novel of Stefan Zweig, and won her the Silver Shell for Best Director at the San Sebastian International Film Festival in Spain.

After two successful art-house films, Xu had a shot in innovative film making in Dreams Come True (2006),  an experimental film shot in one setting. However unlike her previous two films, Dreams Come True was panned by critics.

Xu became the first female director in China whose films gross more than 100 million yuan, for her 2010 film Go Lala Go!. The film, adapted from Li Ke's bestseller of the same name which is about a young woman's growth in society, is Xu's first attempt at commercial production. Go Lala Go! shows the life of middle-class, revealing the accelerated pace of the society as well as the degradation of the social welfare system as a consequence of the rise of neoliberal mindset. The ideology difference between Go Lala Go! and My Father and I indicates a transition of China's old society to the new society, articulating the social reconstruction of China.

In 2014,  Xu Jinglei, as the only female director, ranked fifth on the Chinese directors value list, which selected from mainland directors who have independently directed five or more films in theaters in the past two decades. Xu appears as  "the first female director who has directed six films independently and has earned more than 100 million yuan at the domestic box office and won the international Film Festival awards" on the list. Some industry insiders said that although the persistent exploration of literary avant-garde themes may affect her box office performance, the 36.25 percent return rate confirms the significant effect of "director Xu Jinglei" in the audiences' mind.

Xu continued to direct romantic features Dear Enemy (2011) and Somewhere Only We Know (2015), which were moderately successful at the box office.

Deviating from her former productions which mainly focuses on romance and family, Xu returned with action cop thriller The Missing in 2017. She also announced that she would be producing an alien-themed online comedy series based on the popular online novel "My 200-Million-Year-Old Classmate". This is China's first science fiction school-themed online drama, adapted from the novel of the same name, talking about a story of an alien named Abdouri takes over a high school girl, Xuan Mo's body. First time acting as the producer of a web series, Xu indicates that she didn't do it on a whim, but instead hopes to make a movie-like web series. She chose to work on this series because she saw the uniqueness of the characters and the setting of the story and want to create a milestone for Chinese television industry. For best results, Xu called in her own film crew to help. In addition, in order to present the perfect science fiction special effects in this school youth drama with science fiction elements, Xu Jinglei also invited Nick Hsieh, an international special effects supervisor who has participated in the production of blockbusters such as Pacific Rim and Star Wars, as the special effects director.

Other activities
Xu is popular in China, and in mid-2006, her Chinese-language blog had the most incoming links of any blog in any language on the Internet, according to blog search engine Technorati.

In 2006, Xu founded her own production company, Kaila Pictures Corporation. She uses the same name for her monthly digital magazine, which was first launched in April 2007. On April 27, Xu Jinglei cooperated with Founder Electronics Cooperation to release her personal calligraphy computer characters in FounderType, which was named "Founder Jinglei Simplified". Founder Cooperation claims that this is the first real personal calligraphy computer character library products in China, marking the entry of "computer word bank" into the era of individuation.

In November 2012, Xu participated in the fourth season of China's Got Talent and acted as the judge.

In May 2018, Xu, for her first time, participated in the third season of the Crossover Singer aired on BTV1.

In 2010, she launched her first jewelry line which was sold on online stores.

Xu also launched an education and film fund with 200,000 yuan (US$25,000) to support braille publications, education for the children of migrant workers, and filming.

In 2008, Xu was awarded the honorary title of "China Environmental Ambassador" at an awarding ceremony cosponsored by the Ministry of Environmental Protection and the United Nations Development Program on World Earth Day.

Filmography

Film

Xu's Filmography as a director

Television series

Awards and nominations

References

External links

1974 births
Living people
Beijing Film Academy alumni
Chinese film actresses
Chinese bloggers
Film directors from Beijing
Chinese women film directors
Chinese television actresses
People's Republic of China journalists
Screenwriters from Beijing
20th-century Chinese actresses
21st-century Chinese actresses
Chinese women bloggers
20th-century Chinese women writers
21st-century Chinese women writers
Actresses from Beijing